Roseberry County may refer to:
Roseberry County, Northern Territory, Australia
Roseberry County, Queensland, Australia